The 2017 Conference USA men's soccer season was the 23rd season of men's varsity soccer in the conference. The season began on August 25 and concluded on November 12.

The regular season was won by FIU, while the tournament was won by Old Dominion. Both school's were the conference's bids into the 2017 NCAA Division I Men's Soccer Championship. There, the two programs reached the round of 32 before being eliminated.

Niko Klosterhalfenm and Mercan Akar were named the conference's offensive and defensive most valuable players, respectively. Paul Marie and Alex Bumpus were drafted in the 2018 MLS SuperDraft following the end of the season. Jason Beaulieu and Aaron Herrera signed homegrown contracts with their parent MLS clubs.

Background

Head coaches 
Three programs had first-year head coaches heading into the 2017 season. Former University of Charleston head coach, Chris Grassie was hired as the head coach for Marshall. Former Orlando City SC scout, Kevin Nylen was named the head coach for FIU. Finally, former South Carolina assistant coach, Joey Worthen, was named head coach for Florida Atlantic.

Preseason

Recruiting

Preseason poll 

The preseason poll was announced on August 11, 2017. Charlotte was voted to win the Conference USA regular season. New Mexico, FIU and UAB received first place votes.

Preseason team 

On August 11, the preseason team was announced.

*Preseason Offensive Player of the Year
^Preseason Defensive Player of the Year

Regular season

Early season tournaments 
Three programs participated in early season tournaments. FIU and New Mexico finished undefeated in their respective tournaments, while ODU finished in third place.

Rankings

United Soccer Coaches National

Results

Postseason

C-USA Tournament

NCAA Tournament

Awards

Regular season awards

Players of the Week

Postseason awards

All-C-USA awards and teams

All-Americans

College Soccer News 
Three players in the conference were named All-Americans by CollegeSoccerNews.com.

 Santiago Patino, FIU — Second team All-American
 Paul Marie, FIU — Third team All-American

United Soccer Coaches 

One player in the conference were named All-Americans by United Soccer Coaches.

 Santiago Patino, FIU — First team All-American

MLS SuperDraft

Total picks by school

List of selections

Homegrown contracts

See also 
 2017 NCAA Division I men's soccer season
 2017 Conference USA women's soccer season

References 

 
2017 NCAA Division I men's soccer season